The 33rd International Film Festival of India was held from 1–10 October 2002 in New Delhi. The competitive edition was restricted to "Asian Directors". Deepak Sandhu served as the director for the festival. The Devdas retrospective received special mention. From this edition, the "Film Bazaar" was instituted.

Winners
Golden Peacock (Best Film):  "Letters to Elza" by Igor Maslennikov (Russian film)
Silver Peacock Award for the Most Promising Asian Director: Reza Mirkarimi for "zir e noor e maah" ("Under the Moonlight") (Iranian film)
Silver Peacock Special Jury Award: "Mitr, My Friend" by Revathi (India) and "Asrar EL-Banat" by Magdy Ahmed Aly (Egyptian film)

Devdas Retrospective
Devdas (1935 Bengali) by Pramathesh Barua
Devadasu (1953 Telugu) by Vedantam Raghavayya
Devdas (1955 Hindi) by Bimal Roy
Devdas (2002 Hindi) by Sanjay Leela Bhansali

References

2002 film festivals
33rd
2002 in Indian cinema